The Athinganoi (singular Athinganos, Atsinganoi), were a Manichean sect regarded as Judaizing heretics who lived in Phrygia and Lycaonia but were neither Hebrews nor Gentiles. They kept the Sabbath, but were not circumcised. They were Shomer nagia. 
Other sources mentioned that the Athinganoi were Simonians, and had nothing to do with the Manichean or Paulinic sect, and settled in the year of the East–West Schism in 1054 at Byzantium, and married Byzantine women, adopted Greek Orthodox Christianity and later assimilated in Slavic and Greek Population. In some studies the Athinganoi are described as remnants of the Indo-Greeks who left India in 400 AD during the Migration period.

Name 
The etymology of the word is not certain, but a common determination is a derivation in Greek for "(the) untouchables" (compare Indian Chandala, dalit), derived from a privative alpha prefix and the verb  ("to touch"). The Manichean sect is mentioned in Soghdian sources.

Association with Romani people 
Today many of these words are still used in a derogatory sense, albeit others are the most common exonym for them in a given language.

Historians, such as Rochow, have suggested three different explanations for the association:
 The name may have been transferred from the Christian sect to the Romani people because both had gained a reputation for fortune telling or because the Romani people were perceived to have adopted the religious practices of the sect.
 The name  may have been given to any itinerant people who came from abroad and were perceived to practice a different religion, with the term only later applying more narrowly to the Romani people.

Purported doctrines according to Christian polemicists 
An earlier, and probably quite distinct, sect with the same name is refuted by Marcus Eremita, who seems to have been a disciple of St. John Chrysostom.

They were regarded as Judaizing Heretics. About AD 600, Timotheus, Presbyter of Constantinople, in his book De receptione Haereticorum adds at the end of his list of heretics who need rebaptism the Mandopolini, "now called . They live in Phrygia, and are neither Hebrews nor Gentiles. They keep the Sabbath, but are not circumcised. They will not touch any man. If food is offered to them, they ask for it to be placed on the ground; then they come and take it. They give to others with the same precautions".

See also 
 Names of the Romani people
 Paulicians
 Bogomils
 Cathars

References

Bibliography 

 Joshua Starr: An Eastern Christian Sect: The Athinganoi. In: Harvard Theological Review 29 (1936),   93-106.
 Ilse Rochow: Die Häresie der Athinganer im 8. und 9. Jahrhundert und die Frage ihres Fortlebens. In: Helga Köpstein, Friedhelm Winkelmann (eds.), Studien zum 8. und 9. Jahrhundert in Byzanz, Berlin 1983 (= Berliner Byzantinistische Arbeiten, 51),   163-178.
 Paul Speck: Die vermeintliche Häresie der Athinganoi. In: Jahrbuch der Österreichischen Byzantinistik 47 (1997),  37-50

Trinitarianism
Former Christian denominations
Heresy in Christianity in the Middle Ages
Christian organizations established in the 9th century
Melchizedek
Byzantine Anatolia
Christianity in the Byzantine Empire
Greek words and phrases